The Basketball Hall of Fame Belfast Classic is an eight team college basketball tournament held in November and December of the NCAA Division I men's basketball season, with the inaugural tournament beginning in 2017. It is currently the only college tournament played across the Atlantic, and the first-ever NCAA basketball games played in Europe. In its inaugural season, only four teams participated, but it was increased for the 2018–19 season to eight teams. In 2017, the four participants played all their games at the SSE Arena in Belfast, Northern Ireland, with the winners moving on to the championship game, and the losers playing in the consolation game. Towson was the inaugural champion, defeating Manhattan 56–55, and winning the game on a last second shot by Tigers senior guard Mike Morsell.

The format was changed in 2018, with the schools competing in two four-team brackets, with campus round games in America leading into two tournament brackets in Belfast named Samson and Goliath, which are named after the iconic Harland and Wolff cranes in the Titanic quarter ship yard of Belfast. The semifinals and championship games of each bracket are played in Northern Ireland, with each bracket winner declared champions of their respective brackets.

The tournament is sponsored by The Sport Changes Life Foundation, in partnership with the Naismith Memorial Basketball Hall of Fame and the Metro Atlantic Athletic Conference (MAAC).

Brackets 
* – Denotes overtime period

2018

Campus Games

Goliath Bracket

Samson Bracket

2017

References

External links
Official site of the Basketball Hall of Fame Belfast Classic

College basketball competitions
2017 establishments in Northern Ireland
Basketball in Northern Ireland
Recurring sporting events established in 2017
Sports competitions in Belfast